Marty Belafsky (born September 19, 1975) is an American actor/comedian born in Los Angeles, California.  He began acting professionally at age 13 and was soon cast as Louis Plumb on the short-lived NBC series Hull High.  Shortly thereafter, Belafsky landed the role of Crutchie in the Disney musical film, Newsies.  He continued acting through his teens, making appearances in such television shows as The Wonder Years, Great Scott and Step By Step and the film Wrestling Ernest Hemingway. Belafsky also voiced Kent Swanson in the video game series Dead Rising released in 2006.

Education
In 1993, Belafsky took some time off from acting to attend Brown University, where he honed his comedic skills in the improvisation comedy troupe, Improvidence.  Following graduation, Belafsky returned to Hollywood.

Stand-up
He started doing stand-up comedy at The Laugh Factory, and was soon discovered by comedy legend, Rodney Dangerfield.  Dangerfield hand-picked Belafsky to be his opening act at the MGM Grand in Las Vegas and later gave him starring roles in two of his films, Back By Midnight and The 4th Tenor.

Films
Since then, Belafsky has been featured in such films as Pearl Harbor, Evolution, America's Sweethearts, Back by Midnight, Men in Black II, A Mighty Wind and Funny Money. He has also been featured on television, including a series regular role in MTV's The Lyricist Lounge Show, as well as guest appearances on Still Standing, Six Feet Under and Boston Legal.  Belafsky has done over 40 commercials and continues to tour nationally throughout the U.S.

Filmography
Funny Money (2006)
Boston Legal (2005) (TV)
Still Standing (2004) (TV)
Back by Midnight (2004)
A Mighty Wind (2003)
The 4th Tenor (2002)
Men in Black II (2002)
America's Sweethearts (2001)
Six Feet Under (2001) (TV)
Evolution (2001)
Pearl Harbor (2001)
The Lyricist Lounge Show (2000) (TV)
Step By Step (1998) (TV)
Wrestling Ernest Hemingway (1993)
Breaking the Rules (1992)
Newsies (1992)
Hull High (1990) (TV)
The Wonder Years (1989) (TV)

References

External links

1975 births
Male actors from Los Angeles
American male comedians
American male film actors
American male stage actors
American male television actors
Brown University alumni
Living people
Comedians from California
21st-century American comedians